A log line or logline is a brief (usually one-sentence) summary of a television program, film, short film, or book that states the central conflict of the story, often providing both a synopsis of the story's plot, and an emotional "hook" to stimulate interest.  A one-sentence program summary in TV Guide is a log line. "A log line is a single sentence describing your entire story," however, "it is not a straight summary of the project. It goes to the heart of what a project is about in one or two sentences, defining the theme of the project...and suggest[ing] a bigger meaning." "A logline is a one-sentence summary of the story's main conflict. It is not a statement of theme but rather a premise."

"A logline...helps content creators simply and easily sell their work in a single sentence, because the emphasis is on what makes their property unique...the logline provides the content creator with a concise way to focus on the three main anchors of their writing," the protagonist, the protagonist's wants (goal(s) or desire(s)), and what is at stake (risks).

Elements

Narrative elements often referenced in a logline include the setting, protagonist, antagonist, inciting incident, and a  conflict and a goal (the conflict's resolution). Change, such as character growth, and action should be suggested. A log line should contain four facts: "the main character, what the main character wants," the villain(s) or obstacle(s), "standing in the way," and, "the unique aspect(s) of the story."

Examples

See also 
 High concept

References

 

Television terminology
Film and video terminology